Willy Weibel (21 September 1906 – April 1990) was a Swiss sprinter. He competed in the men's 100 metres at the 1928 Summer Olympics.

References

1906 births
1990 deaths
Athletes (track and field) at the 1928 Summer Olympics
Swiss male sprinters
Olympic athletes of Switzerland
Place of birth missing